Janaki Srinivasa Murthy (born as Vasanti on 12 February 1945), popularly known by her nickname Vaidehi is an Indian writer and well-known writer of modern Kannada language fiction. Vaidehi is one of the most successful women writers in the language and a recipient of prestigious national and state-level literary awards. She has won the Sahitya Akademi Award for her collection of short stories, Krauncha Pakshigalu in 2009.

Biography

Early life
Vaidehi was born on 12 February 1945 to A. V. N. Hebbar (father) and Mahalakshmi (mother) in Kundapura taluk of Udupi district, Karnataka. She grew up in a large traditional Brahmin family. She graduated with a bachelor's degree in Commerce from the Bhandarkar College in Kundapura. Her father is a lawyer and her mother was a homemaker. At home, a dialect of Kannada called Kundapur Kannada is spoken and she uses this dialect in her works as well. Vaidehi became her pen-name under unusual circumstances. Early in her writing career, she had sent a story to the Kannada weekly magazine Sudha for publication but later requested the publisher not to go ahead with the print as the story was non-fictional and included a real-life story. However, the editor went ahead with the publication by changing the author's name to 'Vaidehi'. This name stuck in her later writings as well as she gained popularity.

Married life
Vaidehi married to K. L. Srinivasa Murthy at the age of 23. The couple have two daughters, Nayana Kashyap (née Nayana Murthy) and Pallavi Rao (née Pallavi Murthy). After marriage Vaidehi changed her legal name to Janaki Srinivasa Murthy and moved to Shivamogga. Later the family moved to Udupi and then to Manipal where she currently resides. Vaidehi's daughter Nayana Kashyap is a translator, Kannada writer and English teacher. She has translated some of the Vaidehi's works into English including five novels.

Works

Collection of short stories
Mara Gida Balli (1979)
Antharangada Putagalu (1984)
Gola (1986)
Samaja Shastrajneya Tippanige (1991)
Ammacchi Yemba Nenapu (2000)
Hagalu Geechida Nenta
Krouncha Pakshigalu

Beautiful essays
Mallinathana Dhyana (1996)
Meju Mattu Badagi
Jatre

Novels
Asprushyaru (1992)

Collection of poems
tottilu tuguva hadu
Bindu Bindige (1990)
Parijatha (1999)
Hoova Kattuva Haadu (2011)

Children's dramas
Dham Dhoom Suntaragali
Mookana Makkalu
Gombe Macbeth
Danadangura
Nayimari Nataka
Kotu Gumma
Jhum Jham Aane Mathu Putta
Surya Banda
Ardhachandra Mitayi
Hakki Haadu
Somari Olya

Biography
Nenapinangaladalli Mussanjehothu (life of Kota Lakshminarayana Karanth) 
Sediyapu Nenapugalu - (life of Sediyapu Krishna Bhatta) 
Illiralare allige hogalare - (life of B. V. Karanth)

Translations
Bharathiya Mahileyara Swathanthra Horata (from Kamaladevi Chattopadhyaya's "Indian women's freedom struggle")
Belliya Sankolegalu (from Maithreyi Mukkhopadhyaya's "Silver Shakles")
Surya Kinnariyau (from Swapna Dutta's "Sun Fairies")
Sangeetha Samvada (from Bhaskar Chandavarkar's "Lecture on Music")

Awards
Vaidehi has won numerous awards for her writings in Kannada.

Sahitya Akademi Award (2009) for Krouncha Pakshigalu
Geetha Desai Datti Nidhi (1985, 1992) by Karnataka Lekhakiyara Sangha for Antharangada Putagalu and Bindu Bindige
Vardhamana Udayonmukha Award (1992) by Vardhamana Prashasti Peetha for Gola
Katha Award (1992, 1997) by Katha Organisation, New Delhi for Hagalu Geechida Nenta and Ammacchiyemba Nenapu
Anupama Award (1993) for Samaja Shastrajneya Tippanige
Karnataka State Sahitya Akademi Award (1993, 1998) for her five children's dramas and Mallinathana Dhyana
Sahtya Kama Award for Ammachi Yemba Nenapu
Sadodita Award (2001) by Shashwathi Trust
Sudha Weekly Award for Asprushyaru
Daana Chintamani Attimabbe Award in 1997 by Government of Karnataka
Attimabbe Award by Attimabbe Pratishtan

See also
 List of Indian writers

References

1945 births
Living people
Kannada-language writers
Kannada people
Indian women short story writers
People from Udupi
Recipients of the Sahitya Akademi Award in Kannada
Women writers from Karnataka
Poets from Karnataka
Indian women non-fiction writers
Women biographers
Indian women translators
20th-century Indian translators
Indian women essayists
Indian women children's writers
Indian children's writers
Indian women novelists
20th-century Indian women writers
20th-century Indian poets
20th-century Indian short story writers
20th-century Indian biographers
20th-century Indian essayists
20th-century Indian novelists
Novelists from Karnataka
21st-century Indian women writers
21st-century Indian writers
21st-century Indian poets